Becoming (stylized as BEcoming) is the debut studio album by Haitian American singer and songwriter Stacy Barthe. It was released on July 10, 2015, by Motown and Homeschool Records. It features guest appearances from John Legend and Common.

Release and promotion 
To help promote the album's long-awaited release, a 6-track sampler was uploaded to SoundCloud on December 22, 2014. BEcoming was officially released for digital download and streaming on July 10, 2015, by Motown and John Legend's Homeschool Records. A short film of the same name was released on July 14, 2015—documenting Barthe's struggles with depression, attempted suicide, and weight loss journey.

Singles 
"War IV Love" was released on March 18, 2014, as the album's lead single. "Flawed Beautiful Creatures" was released as the album's second single on December 15, 2014. Both "War IV Love" and "Flawed Beautiful Creatures"—along with non-album cut, "Extraordinary Love"—were featured on BET's NAACP award-winning drama series, Being Mary Jane. A cover of Anita Baker's "Angel", featuring John Legend, was released as the album's third single on December 23, 2014. An abridged version of the cover first appeared on John Legend's fourth studio album, Love in the Future, as an interlude. "Live For Today", featuring Common, was released as the album's fourth single on January 15, 2015. The fifth and final single released was "You Wonder Why?" on June 29, 2015. The single would become Barthe's highest performing release, peaking at number twenty-three on US Billboard's Adult R&B Songs.

Critical reception 

Upon its release, BEcoming received positive reviews from critics. Bobby Carter of npr music proclaimed, "BEcoming is all about brutal, fearless honesty ... when taken as a whole, it feels like a powerful and necessary purge." Gail Mitchell of Billboard described BEcoming as "a powerful, raw narrative about the joys and pains of life." Online R&B publication ThisIsR&B praised the album, stating: "Stacy didn’t simply record an album. Rather she penned an often raw, always real, and undeniably riveting audio diary—recounting her own unbelievable, yet universal story."

Year-end lists

Legacy 
In response to the stay-at-home orders enacted to suppress the COVID-19 pandemic in the United States, the New York Post listed BEcoming at number eight on their list of 10 albums to revisit in 2020—calling it "one of the best R&B LPs of the '10s."

Track listing 
Album credits adapted from Tidal.

Notes
  signifies a co-producer

Sample credits
  "Eyes Wide Shut" contains samples of "Drink My Pain Away", as written by Stacy Barthe, Jesse Woodard IV, Joi Nicole Campbell & Corey Gibson.
  "Live For Today" contains an interpolation of "Mas que Nada", as written and performed by Jorge Ben.
  "Angel" is a cover of "Angel", as written by Anita Baker, Patrick Moten & Sandra Sully; and contains a drum beat from "Make the Music with Your Mouth, Biz", as performed by Biz Markie.

Personnel 
Personnel credits adapted from the liner notes of BEcoming.

Studios 
Recording locations

 The Studio (Los Angeles, CA)
 The Boom Boom Room (Burbank, CA)
 Yoelian's Chambers (Los Angeles, CA)
 KMA Studios (New York, NY)
 Fonogenic Studios (Van Nuys, CA)
 The Pentagon (Silver Lake, CA)

 4220 Studios (Los Angeles, CA)
 Capitol Studios (Hollywood, CA)
 Homeschool Studios (Los Angeles, CA)
 Germano Studios (New York, NY)
 Glenwood Studios (Burbank, CA)
 Studio for the Talented and Gifted (Los Angeles, CA)

Mixing & mastering locations

 Larrabee Sound Studios (North Hollywood, CA)
 Jinju Sounds (Hoboken, NJ)

 Sterling Sound (New York, NY)

Vocals 

 Stacy Barthe – main artist
 Common – featured artist (track 8)
 John Legend – featured artist (track 14)

 Iris Belson – backing vocals (track 3)
 Joseph Walker – backing vocals (track 3)
 Ro James – backing vocals (track 13)

Musicians 

 Malay – guitar (tracks 3–5, 10–13), bass (tracks 3–5, 10–13), keyboards (tracks 3–5, 10–13)
 Joseph Walker – guitar (track 3)
 Tykie Irby – guitar (track 17), bass (track 17)
 Matt Chamberlain – drums (tracks 1, 3, 12, 13)
 Charles LA Harper – percussion (tracks 3, 5, 15)
 Chris Arceneaux – percussion (tracks 3, 5, 15)

 Fall of Ai Chamber Orchestra – strings (tracks 1, 4)
 Geoff Gallegos – saxophone (tracks 3, 8)
 Shaunte Palmer – trombone (tracks 3, 8)
 Jamelle Williams - trumpet (tracks 3, 8)
 Darhyl Camper Jr. – piano (track 6)
 Jeff Babko – piano (track 6)

Production 

 Stacy Barthe – executive production
 John Legend – executive production
 Malay – executive production, production (tracks 1, 3–5, 10–13), co-production (track 1)
 Eddie Blackmon – executive production
 Hit-Boy – production (track 1)
 Oren Yoel – production (track 2)

 DJ Camper – production (tracks 6, 9)
 Ran Pink – production (tracks 7, 8, 16)
 Dirty Harry – production (track 14)
 James Poyser – production (track 14)
 Benny Cassette – production (track 15)
 The ClassMatez – production (track 17)

Technical 

 Malay – recording engineer (tracks 1, 3–5, 10–13), programming (tracks 1, 4, 5, 10–12)
 Oren Kleinman – recording engineer (track 2)
 Michael Piazza – recording engineer (track 6)
 Ran Pink – recording engineer (tracks 7, 16)
 Benny Cassette – recording engineer (tracks 8, 15)
 Michael Thomas – recording engineer (track 8)
 Joe Napolitano – recording engineer (track 9)
 James Caruana – recording engineer (track 14)

 Jacob Dennis – additional engineering (track 14)
 Jason Agel – mixing (track 9), recording engineer (track 14)
 Manny Marroquin – mixing (tracks 1–8, 10–17)
 Chris Galland – mix assistant (tracks 1–8, 10–17)
 Ike Schultz – mix assistant (tracks 1–8, 10–12, 14–17)
 Delbert Bowers – mix assistant (track 13)
 Chris Gehringer – mastering
 Dave Kutch – mastering

Management 

 Eddie Blackmon – a&r, management
 Rex Rideout – a&r
 Elizabeth Isik – a&r admin
 Terese Joseph – a&r admin

 A Shade of Red Entertainment – management
 Lynn M. Scott – marketing coordinator
 Wealth Management Associates – business management
 Myman Greenspan Fineman/Fox Rosenberg & Light LLP – legal

Design 

 Joe R. Perez – creative direction & design
 Jenna Marsh – art direction

 Geo Owen – assistant graphic design
 Pavel Paratov – animation

Charts

Release history

References

External links 
 

2015 albums
Rhythm and blues albums by American artists
Motown albums